The 2021 season for  was the 23rd season in the team's existence and the fifth under the current name. The team has been a UCI WorldTeam since 2005, when the tier was first established.

Team roster 

Riders who joined the team for the 2021 season

Riders who left the team during or after the 2020 season

Season victories

National, Continental, and World Champions

Notes

References

External links 
 

UAE Team Emirates
2021
UAE Team Emirates